The T-1000 is a fictional character in the Terminator franchise. A shapeshifting android Terminator assassin, the T-1000 is the main antagonist of Terminator 2: Judgment Day, as well as a minor antagonist in Terminator Genisys and the theme park attraction T2 3-D: Battle Across Time. A similar Terminator, referred to as a T-1001, appears in the Fox television series, Terminator: The Sarah Connor Chronicles.

In the films, the T-1000 was created by the franchise's main antagonist, Skynet, a rogue self-aware artificial intelligence that directs its robotic creations against the Human Resistance in an all-out war. The T-1000 is described in Terminator 2 (T2) as being composed of liquid metal, or a mimetic polyalloy (nanorobotics) that can manipulate itself to assume various forms. Aside from being able to camouflage itself by assuming the appearance of nondescript objects or take on the likeness of any humans it terminates in pursuit of its goals, the T-1000's shapeshifting abilities enable it to form its limbs, arms, hands and fingers into lethal weapons like sharp stabbing blades and hard hammering objects. It can also slip through narrow physical openings by oozing into its fully liquid form, as well as reforming itself from almost any physical damage. It is further explained in the prologue of the film's novelization that the T-1000 was created through nanotechnology, and is a "Nanomorph", able to scan the molecular structure of whatever it is touching and visually mimic it.

In T2, the T-1000's default form is portrayed by Robert Patrick, and in Terminator Genisys, by Lee Byung-hun, while other actors portray the T-1000 in the disguise of specific characters. In Terminator 2 and T2: 3-D Battle Across Time, the T-1000 is presented as a technological leap over the T-800 Terminator (Arnold Schwarzenegger), also known as a Model 101. Described by AllMovie as "one of the most memorable roles in one of the most memorable films of the decade", Patrick's portrayal of the T-1000 earned him nominations for Best Villain and Best Supporting Actor at the 1992 MTV and Saturn Awards. The T-1000 was ranked #39 in the Online Film Critics Society's 2002 list of the "Top 100 Villains of All Time", and #19 in Empires 2018 recounting of the best cinematic villains.

Creation 
Writer/director James Cameron stated that his original intention for the sequel was that both Terminators sent to the past would be T-800s like the one played by Arnold Schwarzenegger, with one being stripped down to a metal endoskeleton like the one from the original film, The Terminator. Once Cameron actually started working on the script, in 1990, he figured a better way was to turn the evil Terminator into a more advanced model.

Cameron's original pick to play the T-1000 was rock musician Billy Idol, and storyboards had the android resembling him, but a serious motorcycle accident prevented Idol from accepting the role. Blackie Lawless, the lead singer of W.A.S.P., was also considered for the role but he was deemed too tall. Then, Cameron thought of casting actor Michael Biehn, who played Kyle Reese in The Terminator, in the role with the explanation that Skynet managed to acquire Reese's DNA and use it for a new Terminator. Cameron ultimately dropped this idea after deciding the audience would find it too confusing. Eventually, casting came down to Robert Patrick, as a deliberate contrast to the original Terminator: Cameron stated "I wanted to find someone who would be a good contrast to Arnold. If the 800 series is a kind of human Panzer tank, then the 1000 series had to be a Porsche." For a more machine-like performance, Patrick had to learn how to both fire a pistol without flinching (or blinking) and run effortlessly without heavy breathing or signs of exhaustion.

The development of computer-generated imagery (CGI) by Industrial Light & Magic to manipulate, re-create, and "morph" the image of an actor was used in the creation of the T-1000 character in the film. The computer graphics composed 6 of the 15 minutes that the T-1000 displays its morphing and healing abilities. The other 9 were achieved in camera with the use of advanced animatronic puppets and prosthetic effects created by Stan Winston and his team, who were also responsible for the metal skeleton effects of the T-800. The visual effects used in Terminator 2 to create the T-1000 won the Academy Award for Visual Effects.

In Terminator Genisys, the effects of the T-1000 were made by British effects company Double Negative, also responsible for the T-3000 and T-5000 terminators. The animation was mostly similar to how it was done in Terminator 2, only with more advanced fluid simulations. To properly depict the liquid metal being dissolved by acid, Double Negative's artists studied acid dissolving aluminum, and had its final distorted forms inspired by The Thing.

Appearance and abilities

In the Terminator 2 storyline, the T-1000 is made of liquid metal. The T-800 explains that the T-1000 is a more advanced Terminator, composed entirely of a "mimetic polyalloy", rendering it capable of rapid shape shifting, near-perfect mimicry and recovery from damage. Furthermore, it can use its ability to liquify and assume alternative forms such as fitting through narrow openings, morphing its arms into solid metal tools or bladed weapons, walking through prison bars, flattening itself and imitating the pattern and texture of the ground to hide or ambush targets.

The T-1000 can change its surface color and texture to convincingly simulate flesh, clothing, and other nonmetallic materials. It is capable of accurately mimicking voices as well, including the ability to extrapolate a relatively small voice sample to generate a wider array of words or inflections as required. However, its morphing abilities are limited by complexity, mass, and volume: it cannot transform into complex machines with mechanical moving parts or chemical fuels (such as guns or bombs), limiting it to stabbing weapons, and its volume prevents it from taking the form of a smaller object like a pack of cigarettes, although it is capable of impersonating larger people - the novelization states that mimicking an obese security guard "strained its ability".

Like all Terminators, the T-1000 possesses superhuman strength, greater than that of the T-800. Thanks to its morphing abilities and resistance to mechanical damage, it is shown to be capable of overpowering the T-800 in hand-to-hand combat, despite its more slender frame and smaller stature compared to its predecessor. It can also run fast enough to catch up to a police car accelerating away from it.

Due to its fluid nature, the T-1000 has a much higher tolerance to damage from small arms and blunt trauma than the T-800, high-kinetic impacts from shotgun blasts or a large explosion will knock it out for a few moments before it can recover. When separated from the host each liquid form cell is programmed to detect and seek out larger groups of cells within a range of 29 kilometers.

The T-1000's weaknesses are extreme temperatures, as shown in Terminator 2. Liquid nitrogen freezes it solid, and after being shot by the T-800 it shatters into pieces which then melt and reform.  The Special Edition DVD release of Terminator 2 shows that the freezing, shattering and thawing causes severe damage to the nanotechnology, and the T-1000 begins malfunctioning - unable to fully control morphing, which allows John Connor to see through one of its disguises. After the Terminator shoots it with a grenade launcher, it is so distorted and off-balance from the gap in its torso that it slips and falls into a molten steel vat. It then shapeshifts uncontrollably into its previous human disguises/victims, and it turns itself inside-out to try to shield itself from the molten steel and is then permanently destroyed when the searing heat disassembles its nanotechnological "cells" on a microscopic level. It is also susceptible to chemical damage as shown in Terminator Genisys where Sarah tricks it into entering a room filled with sprinklers that rain down acidic chemicals. The T-1000 is also not specifically designed to encounter other Terminators and has little knowledge of their diagnostics. This allows the T-800 to take it by surprise. The T-1000 had previously shut the T-800 down, but did not know of the older model's emergency reboot power mode. 

The T-1000 is apparently capable of espionage and detective skills, as it often attempts to accomplish its goals by subterfuge instead of brute force and extreme violence as the earlier T-800 resorted to. Its main disguise for the duration of Terminator 2 is as a police officer, allowing it to gain trust, access information, and provide a benign, friendly appearance. It also imitates John Connor's foster mother, Janelle Voight, to try to gain John's confidence. In fact, the T-1000 is able to pass as human, possessing a larger repertoire of behavioral expression and interpersonal skills than earlier Terminator models. While the earlier T-800 also had some non-violent interactions and used a phone book to track Sarah Connor, T-1000 uses a variety of deceptions and is much more human-like.

It is also capable of exploiting the emotions of its targets, as in the steel foundry when it tortures Sarah Connor to call out for her son, anticipating that she would respond accordingly. A T-1000 demonstrates annoyance when dealing with the T-800, in Terminator 2 and another T-1000 demonstrates annoyance with Kyle Reese in Terminator: Genisys, and tilts its head in salute to Sarah when she devises a method to distinguish it from the person it mimics. Additionally, it is able to express fear and pain, as demonstrated in Terminator 2 when the T-1000 gives a brief look of shock after the T-800 shoots a grenade into its stomach, and when it writhes in agony after falling into a vat of molten metal. The same is shown in Genisys, when the Guardian holds it under a hydrochloric acid shower and it frantically struggles to get free before it is destroyed.

In Genisys, it is also shown that the T-1000 has the ability to repair damaged machines and use its own body as independent weapons and gadgets, such as a spear or a tracking device. It severs its own arm and hurls it as a javelin to impale the Guardian to a wall, reactivates a broken T-800 by infusing it with some polyalloy and it latches a piece of itself onto a lock in order to track the Guardian's truck.

Films

Terminator 2: Judgment Day

Teaser trailers for Terminator 2 deliberately withheld that the T-1000 character was the villain and the T-800 (the villain in the preceding The Terminator) was now the protector. A tagline for the film was "This time there are two. Terminator 2."

In Terminator 2: Judgment Day, the T-1000 (Patrick) is sent by Skynet back in time to kill a young John Connor (Edward Furlong), the future leader of the Human Resistance against Skynet. The T-1000 ambushes a Los Angeles Police Department police officer on arrival and takes on his identity, tracking down John Connor through the police cruiser's on-board computer and eventually confronting him in a shopping mall. As it prepares to kill John, a T-800 Model 101 sent by the Resistance to protect John shows up to engage it. Following a brief scuffle and a lengthy truck chase, the T-800 and John escape from the T-1000. 

The T-1000 then pays a visit to John's foster home and takes the place of his foster mother, Janelle Voight (Jenette Goldstein), intending to wait for John to return, but John calls ahead and the T-800 is able to confirm that the T-1000 has infiltrated the house when it incorrectly names John's dog. 

After learning of the deception and killing John's foster father (Xander Berkeley), the T-1000 is thwarted again at Pescadero State Hospital, where John and the T-800 rescue John's mother, Sarah Connor (Linda Hamilton) before the T-1000 can copy and terminate her, and again escape from it. After tracking the Connors and the T-800 to Cyberdyne Systems Corporation headquarters, it gives chase and crashes a truck carrying liquid nitrogen into a steel mill.

The T-1000 is frozen solid by leaking liquid nitrogen, allowing the T-800 to shatter it with a single pistol round. After the T-1000 reforms (but its shapeshifting capability malfunctions) the T-800 engages it in hand-to-hand combat, to buy time for Sarah and John, but is defeated and shut down in the process. The T-1000 then continues the hunt for John, unaware that the T-800 has rerouted power and reactivated itself.

The T-1000 copies Sarah's form and confronts John but is stopped by the real Sarah. It survives Sarah's shotgun blasts but is finally done in by the T-800 who fires his last grenade, which detonates inside the T-1000. While attempting to reform, it stumbles and falls backwards into a vat of molten steel. Unable to stand the high temperature, it is melted and consumed.

Terminator 3: Rise of the Machines
Despite failing to eliminate John Connor (Nick Stahl), it is later revealed in Terminator 3: Rise of the Machines that the T-1000 inadvertently interfered with the development of his relationships with Kate Brewster (Claire Danes), with whom he attended junior high school, and her father, Robert (David Andrews), who is overseeing the development of Skynet in the third film.

The T-1000's successor is the T-X, designed to not only terminate humans but also rogue Terminators reprogrammed by the Resistance, an "anti-terminator terminator" as stated by John Connor. The T-X is a composite of the T-800 and T-1000, combining the former's solid endoskeleton covered with the latter's liquid metal "mimetic polyalloy", allowing it to take the shape of any humanoid it touches. Because it is only coated in this material, it is possible to remove it from the endoskeleton using immensely strong magnetic force, such as that from a cyclic particle accelerator. Having a solid endoskeleton did solve some of the T-1000's problems, namely being deformed by temperature extremes and explosives while also lacking built-in ranged weaponry. However, the endoskeleton makes the T-X less flexible than its T-1000 predecessor, in that the T-X does not have the ability to liquefy and assume forms in innovative and surprising ways, including fitting through narrow openings, morphing its arms into solid metal tools or bladed weapons, walking through prison bars and narrow openings, or flattening itself. As a result, the T-X is eventually defeated when its legs are lost after a helicopter crashes into it and its main body destroyed when the T-101 sent back to fight it triggers its own internal power cell to explode while in close proximity to its opponent.

Terminator Genisys

South Korean actor Lee Byung-hun portrays a T-1000 in Terminator Genisys. In the film, it is revealed that Skynet sent the T-1000 to kill Sarah Connor (portrayed by Willa Taylor as a child) at Big Bear Lake in 1973. It killed her parents but she escaped and was subsequently found by a reprogrammed T-800 whom she refers to as "Pops," (credited as "Guardian") sent by an unknown party to be her guardian. The subsequent arrivals of the two machines effectively alters the course of Sarah's life. Eleven years later, in the form of an Asian American LAPD police officer, the T-1000 intercepts Kyle Reese (Jai Courtney) after Kyle arrives from 2029. As Kyle has no experience battling a T-1000, he is unable to defeat it. The T-1000 chases Reese into an adjacent clothing store, where Reese steals clothing only to be accosted by two police officers, Garber and O'Brien, who handcuff him. The T-1000 attacks, killing Garber, and almost killing O'Brien and Reese before it is interrupted by the arrival of Sarah Connor (Emilia Clarke) and the Guardian (Schwarzenegger) in an armored truck. By latching a piece of itself onto the truck's back door handle by, the T-1000 tails the three to the Guardian's warehouse base and attacks them again. It uses pieces of itself to pin the Guardian to a wall and to reactivate Skynet's T-800 to chase Kyle Reese while pursuing Sarah. It masquerades as Reese in an attempt to fool Sarah, but Sarah sees through the ruse and lures the T-1000 into a shower of hydrochloric acid, severely destabilizing its molecular structure and weakening it. Despite this, it tries to kill Sarah, but the Guardian grabs it and holds it under the acid shower until it disintegrates completely, destroying it.

After Sarah and Reese travel to the year 2017, they are recognized by an older O'Brien, whose experience with the T-1000 leads him to believe their story about Skynet and Genisys and free them from custody so they can stop Judgment Day from happening. In the film's climactic battle between the Guardian and John Connor, the latter having been transformed by Skynet into the malicious T-3000, the damaged Guardian is thrown into Cyberdyne's vat of liquid metal to be used for the creation of T-1000s which restores it and gives it the shapeshifting abilities of a T-1000.

Original draft

McG, the director of Terminator Salvation, previously mentioned that the T-1000 would be reintroduced in what was to be his concept of the fifth film: "I like the idea and the perspective for the next picture that you meet Robert Patrick the way he looks today, and he's a scientist that's working on, you know, improving cell replication so we can stay healthier and we can cure diabetes and do all these things that sound like good ideas, and to once again live as idealized expressions as ourselves." He also said the origin story they had in mind for the T-1000 would satirize the world's "obsession" with youth and aging. 

This concept, however, was scrapped when the series was rebooted with Terminator Genisys, in which the T-1000 was portrayed by Lee Byung-hun.

Terminator: Dark Fate
In Terminator: Dark Fate, Gabriel Luna portrays the Rev-9, an advanced combination of both the T-800 and the T-1000. The Rev-9 originated from another A.I. called Legion, and is able to split into two separate units: an endoskeleton and a liquid-metal unit. Like the T-1000, it can take on the physical appearance of anyone it touches, while at the same time, it can transform its liquid metal exterior into stabbing and blunt trauma weapons.

Non-Terminator films
 Robert Patrick as the T-1000 briefly appeared in the 1992 film Wayne's World. In a scene where Wayne is pulled over for speeding, the T-1000 - dressed in a police uniform - pulls out a picture of John Connor and asks Wayne if he has seen him, in the same manner he did in Terminator 2. This results in Wayne screaming in terror and driving away.
 Robert Patrick as the T-1000 also briefly appeared in the 1993 film Last Action Hero as it was seen walking out the same building that Danny and Jack Slater (played by Schwarzenegger) were entering. Danny tries to tell Jack about the T-1000 he just saw, but Jack ignores him completely.

Attraction

T2-3D: Battle Across Time

Patrick reprised his role as the T-1000 in T2-3D: Battle Across Time, a Universal Studios theme park movie ride. In this short film, The Terminator (Schwarzenegger) takes John Connor (Furlong) to the year 2029 to aid him in destroying Skynet once and for all. On their way, the T-1000 chases after John and the Terminator while they are on a motorcycle. They lose its pursuit after the Terminator shoots at it with a shotgun several times.

Television

Terminator: The Sarah Connor Chronicles

A T-1001 Terminator, a second liquid metal prototype, is introduced in the 2008 television series, Terminator: The Sarah Connor Chronicles at the start of the show's second season (though sometimes misidentified as a T-1000 by reviewers). It masquerades as Catherine Weaver (Shirley Manson), the co-founder and current CEO of ZeiraCorp. "Weaver" often has mixed results when socially interacting both with subordinates at ZeiraCorp and Weaver's daughter Savannah (portrayed by Mackenzie Smith), but was written with an improved ability to adapt to and sustain itself in changing situations more adeptly than prior Terminators. It was unable to make convincing smiles or relate to people, despite being more advanced than the T-1000, which seemed to be better at social interaction. However, the T-1001 was able to successfully lead a company and use literary allegories.

The T-1001's mission remains unclear throughout the television series, but diverts from the single-minded attempts to assassinate the Connors, as seen in the prior films. Through most of the TV series, the T-1001, as well as Sarah Connor and her allies, did not appear to be aware of each other's existence. As the head of ZeiraCorp, the T-1001 diverts that company's resources into developing an artificial intelligence, titled "Project Babylon", which appeared sufficient to combat Skynet's development. Catherine Weaver is first seen in the second season opener when she purchases the late Andy Goode's Turk computer system for $300,000 from an associate and then introduces this new computer system to her department heads to reveal her plans to create a new artificial intelligence computer system. Towards this end, Catherine Weaver recruits FBI Special Agent James Ellison to find and capture a Terminator in order to reverse engineer it using a variety of deceptions. Until the end of the series, Ellison is never aware of Weaver's true nature. Ellison delivers a T-888 Terminator's body to Weaver after it was critically damaged by Connor's Terminator bodyguard. The T-1001 advocates learning more about the 'robots' in order to prevent Judgment Day. With Ellison's initial mission complete, it assigns him to act as tutor/mentor to the nascent AI now connected to the T-888's body, which Weaver nicknames "John Henry".

John Henry quickly identifies Weaver as a machine, albeit different from itself, but obeys Weaver's instruction not to share that information with anyone, assuring him that everything done at ZeiraCorp is for John Henry's benefit. At one point, Weaver reveals a clue to the nature of its mission when it tells Ellison that Savannah's future safety is dependent upon John Henry, but that the reverse is not the case. This appears to be in contradiction to the assumption that Weaver was coordinating the efforts to develop Skynet to eradicate humanity.

In the television series, the true nature of the T-1001's entire mission is never revealed, and much of what Weaver does in furtherance of it seems contradictory. In one of the episodes that shifts between the present day and post-Judgment Day, it is learned that the leader of the resistance, John Connor, asked a liquid metal Terminator to join him, and the Terminator refused. In the series finale, by way of introduction, the T-1001 asks (using the same phrase) the same of Connor (and his bodyguard Cameron, who was privy to the aforementioned events in the future) through Ellison, sent as intermediary.

Also in the season/series finale, when Sarah Connor and John Connor finally meet Catherine Weaver face-to-face at her office, Ellison, Sarah, and John all discover Weaver's true nature when she uses her Terminator liquid metal abilities to form a shield to protect them from a flying Kaliba Corp drone which crash-dives into the ZeiraCorp building. When Sarah Connor discovers that ZeiraCorp possesses Andy Goode's Turk, she assumes that Weaver is constructing Skynet but Weaver corrects her by stating that she is "building something to fight it," and implies that she is not originated from Skynet, but its rival: the Turk's future self. Upon entering the basement, the four discover that John Henry has transported himself to the future with Cameron's chip, leaving Cameron's empty body. When Ellison and Sarah Connor decline to jump forward in time with Weaver and John Connor, Weaver instructs Ellison to pick up Savannah from gymnastics.

Weaver then transports itself and John Connor to a post-Judgment Day future in which John Connor is not known to the human resistance. Though Connor and the T-1001 arrived naked, the T-1001 forms "clothing" a moment later. After briefly talking to John, the Terminator slips away when the human resistance encounters John, thus leaving its whereabouts unknown.

Comics

Terminator 2: Judgment Day – Nuclear Twilight
In the Terminator 2: Judgment Day – Nuclear Twilight comic published by Malibu Comics in 1996, an injured Tech-Com soldier named "Griffith" is abducted by a troop of T-800 Terminators and brought back to Skynet. He is drugged and, while in a delirious state (believing he has died and gone to Heaven), questioned by Skynet about Tech-Com's acquisition of a T-800 unit. After he has supplied all the information he is aware of, two T-1000 Terminators enter the room and assume his appearance before killing him. One is sent to infiltrate the human resistance, the other sent through time to kill John Connor as outlined in the Terminator 2 movie. In the simultaneously published Terminator 2: Judgment Day – Cybernetic Dawn, set just after the film, a female T-1000 and two T-800s come to the present to make sure the creation of Skynet happens as planned.

Terminator/RoboCop: Kill Human
In the second crossover between Terminator and RoboCop, the T-1000 plays a fairly significant role. It is the same model as from Terminator 2: Judgment Day. His role is not changed, he still intends to kill John Connor, but this time he must confront RoboCop as well to get to John Connor. RoboCop manages to save John and Sarah because he came from the future to stop the downfall of humanity, which even with the resistance fighting back, the war was lost for humanity. RoboCop shows no interest in keeping John and Sarah safe however, all he wants to do is prevent the future from happening. The T-1000 finds his targets on a naval base, set up by RoboCop. He gets in, but the vessel they are on begins to sink, but even with some help from the re-activated T-800 unit, John Connor is dead and the vessel sinks to the bottom of the sea, with everyone on board possibly drowning in the fight. Even the two Terminators and RoboCop are destroyed by a chemical compound designed to destroy metals, which has seeped into the waters.

Video game
The T-1000 is featured alongside the T-800 in Call of Duty: Vanguard, where they are playable operators.

References

External links
 
 
 

Terminator (franchise) characters
Action film villains
Characters created by James Cameron
Fictional amorphous creatures
Fictional androids
Fictional assassins
Fictional aviators
Fictional characters who can move at superhuman speeds
Fictional characters who can stretch themselves
Fictional characters with accelerated healing
Fictional characters with superhuman durability or invulnerability
Fictional characters with superhuman strength
Fictional mass murderers
Fictional people from the 21st-century
Fictional shapeshifters
Fictional super soldiers
Film characters introduced in 1991
Film supervillains
Nanotechnology in fiction
Robot supervillains
Science fiction weapons
Time travelers